Felix Banaszak (born 24 October 1989) is a German politician of the Alliance 90/The Greens who has been serving as a member of the Bundestag since the 2021 German federal election.

Early career 
During his studies, Banaszak worked as legislative assistant to Dirk Behrendt at the State Parliament of Berlin. From 2014 to 2017, he managed the Düsseldorf offices of Members of the European Parliament Terry Reintke and Sven Giegold.

Political career 
From 2013 to 2014, Banaszak co-chaired the Green Youth on the national level, alongside Theresa Kalmer.

Since 2018, Banaszak has been serving as co-chair of the Green Party in North Rhine-Westphalia, alongside Mona Neubaur.

In the negotiations to form a so-called traffic light coalition of the Social Democrats (SPD), the Green Party and the Free Democratic Party (FDP) following the 2021 federal elections, Banaszak led his party's delegation in the working group on education policy; his co-chairs from the other parties were Andreas Stoch and Jens Brandenburg.

Banaszak has been a member of the German Bundestag since 2021, representing the Duisburg II district. In parliament, he has since been serving on the Budget Committee, the Audit Committee and the Committee on Economic Affairs. On the Budget Committee, he is his parliamentary group's rapporteur on the annual budgets of the Federal Ministry for Economic Affairs and Climate Action and the Federal Ministry for Economic Cooperation and Development.

In addition to his committee assignments, Banaszak has been a member of the German delegation to the Franco-German Parliamentary Assembly since 2022.

In the negotiations to form a coalition government of the Christian Democratic Union (CDU) and the Green Party under Minister-President of North Rhine-Westphalia Hendrik Wüst following the 2022 state elections, Banaszak and Sven Giegold led their party's delegation in the working group on finances; their counterparts from the CDU were Lutz Lienenkämper and Günter Krings.

Other activities 
 GIZ, Member of the supervisory board (since 2022) 
 IG Metall, Member (since 2021)
 Sea-Watch, Member (since 2015)
 German United Services Trade Union (ver.di), Member (since 2014)

Political positions 
Within the Green Party, Banaszak is considered to be part of its left wing.

In his capacity as co-chair of the Green Youth, Banaszak opposed a 2014 motion to make the group's membership incompatible with a membership for Rote Hilfe e.V., a German far-left prisoner support group.

Controversy 
Along with Volker Beck, Terry Reintke and Max Lucks, Banaszak was temporarily detained when Beck wanted to speak publicly at Istanbul Pride in June 2016.

Personal life 
Since 2014, Banaszak has been living in Duisburg.

References

External links 
 

Living people
1989 births
People from Duisburg
21st-century German politicians
Members of the Bundestag for Alliance 90/The Greens
Members of the Bundestag 2021–2025
Free University of Berlin alumni
20th-century German people